The Picture of Dorian Gray is a 1945 American horror-drama film based on Oscar Wilde's 1890 novel of the same name. Released in June 1945 by Metro-Goldwyn-Mayer, the film was directed by Albert Lewin, and stars George Sanders as Lord Henry Wotton and Hurd Hatfield as Dorian Gray. Shot primarily in black-and-white, the film features four colour inserts in three-strip Technicolor of Dorian's portrait; these are a special effect, the first two inserts picturing a youthful Dorian and the second two a degenerate one.

Plot
While posing for a painting by his friend Basil Hallward, handsome young aristocrat Dorian Gray meets Hallward's friend Lord Henry Wotton. Wotton persuades Gray the only worthwhile life is dedicated to pleasure, because "what the gods give they quickly take away." Contemplating this, Gray wishes his portrait could age instead of him. He makes this wish in the presence of an Egyptian cat statue with supposed magical powers.

After callously breaking off his engagement to tavern singer Sibyl Vane, Gray finds the portrait has begun to change and wonders if his wish may have come true. He has the portrait locked away in his old schoolroom and disguises its location by firing servants who moved the painting, while Gray becomes more dedicated to a sinful and heartless life.

Years later, Dorian is 40 but still looks 22. London society is awestruck at his unchanging appearance. The portrait has remained locked away, with Gray holding the only key. Over the years, the portrait of the young, handsome, Dorian Gray has warped into a hideous, demon-like creature reflecting his many sins. When Hallward sees his painting, Gray murders his friend and seals his body in the school room next to the portrait, then blackmails his friend, Allen Campbell, to dispose of Hallward's body. Campbell, distraught at his role in destroying Hallward's corpse, commits suicide.

Gray starts a romance with Hallward's niece, Gladys. James Vane, Sibyl's brother, follows Gray to his country estate to achieve revenge for Sibyl's death and is shot by accident during a hunting party.

Gray despairs at his impact on others and realises he can spare Gladys from misfortune by leaving her. After sending Gladys a letter breaking their engagement, Gray confronts his portrait and sees a subtle improvement. He stabs the portrait in the heart, seeking to end the spell, but cries out as if he has also been stabbed. His friends, realizing what has happened, burst into the schoolroom to discover Gray dead next to the portrait, his deformed body now reflecting his sins in physical form. The portrait, by contrast, once more shows Dorian Gray as a young, innocent man.

Cast

Production

Differences between movie and book
Changes to the original include the romance between Gladys and David and “some censorship restrictions that kept Dorian's unspeakable acts offscreen.”  In the book, the picture alters in response to Dorian's "good deed", but the alteration is ugly, reflecting his cynicism and self-serving motivation. He stabs the painting to destroy his conscience and eliminate the evidence. In the film, he reads a faint change in the painting as a sign of hope, yet stabs the painting as if he can undo his past. As he is transformed off-screen, he prays for forgiveness.

The paintings

Two paintings of the character Dorian Gray were used in the film. The painting titled Picture of Dorian Gray used at the end of the film was painted on commission during the making of the film in 1943-1944 by Ivan Le Lorraine Albright, an American artist who was well known as a painter of the macabre. Created specifically for use in the film, it is now part of the art collection of the Art Institute of Chicago. Albright painted and altered the picture while the movie was being made to allow it to represent the development of Dorian's character.

The portrait of Dorian Gray seen in the beginning of the film was painted by Henrique Medina, and is titled Portrait of Hurd Hatfield as Dorian Gray. It was originally sold at an MGM auction in 1970 when the contents of the studio were sold at a series of auctions lasting several months. It was then sold in a Butterfield and Butterfield Entertainment Memorabilia auction in 1997 for $17,250, and in 2015 it sold at Christie's, New York, for $149,000 and is believed to be in a private collection.

Music
The first piano piece played by Dorian to Sibyl is Frédéric Chopin's "Prelude No 24 in D minor". Played later in the Blue Gate Field house is Ludwig van Beethoven's "Moonlight Sonata".

Box office
According to MGM records, the film earned $1,399,000 in the U.S. and Canada and $1,576,000 elsewhere, resulting in a loss of $26,000.

Awards and nominations

 AFI's 100 Years...100 Thrills – No. 86
 AFI's 100 Years...100 Heroes and Villains:
 Dorian Gray — Nominated Villain

See also
 Adaptations of The Picture of Dorian Gray

Notes

References

External links

 
 
 
 
 

1945 films
1945 drama films
1945 horror films
1940s fantasy films
1940s historical horror films
American black-and-white films
American drama films
American historical films
American supernatural horror films
Films based on The Picture of Dorian Gray
Films directed by Albert Lewin
Films featuring a Best Supporting Actress Golden Globe-winning performance
Films produced by Pandro S. Berman
Films set in London
Films set in 1886
Films set in the 1890s
Films partially in color
Films whose cinematographer won the Best Cinematography Academy Award
Metro-Goldwyn-Mayer films
Films scored by Herbert Stothart
Historical fantasy films
1940s English-language films
1940s American films